North West Kent is a geographical area in Kent, a county in south-east England. The term North West Kent may refer to one or both of two distinct areas; one is entirely within the modern boundaries of Kent, whereas the other also contains parts of Greater London that fall within the traditional boundaries of Kent.

In the present-day county, North West Kent comprises the administrative districts of Dartford Borough, Gravesham Borough, the town of Swanley and certain nearby villages in the northern part of Sevenoaks District along the A20 corridor, including Farningham, Eynsford and West Kingsdown.

In London, the term is also used to describe the certain areas within the London boroughs of Bexley and Bromley that do not have SE postcodes and are historically and postally part of the county of Kent.

In 1998 there was a government proposal to unite the parts of the area that reman within Kent as a unitary authority, which was subsequently dismissed after a public enquiry.

Notable developments in the area include the Queen Elizabeth II Bridge, Ebbsfleet International railway station and Bluewater Shopping Centre.

References

Geography of Kent